The Cleopatra Curse is a fantasy novel by English writer Katherine Roberts, the seventh and final novel in The Seven Fabulous Wonders series and the sequel to The Colossus Crisis.

2006 British novels
British fantasy novels
Novels by Katherine Roberts
HarperCollins books
Fictional depictions of Cleopatra in literature